Bowland College is the oldest and fourth largest constituent college of Lancaster University. The college was named after the Forest of Bowland, to the east of Lancaster. Members of the college are informally referred to as Bowlanders.

History
Bowland was founded alongside Lonsdale College as the first two colleges of the university in 1964. The Bowland and Lonsdale buildings were built as mirror images of each other, but Lonsdale's building was not completed until a year after Bowland's, making Bowland the oldest college on campus.
After Lonsdale's move to south-west campus in 2004, the original Lonsdale building was taken over by Bowland and is today known as "Bowland North".

Since 2004 the two colleges have competed in the annual Founders Series, consisting of nineteen sports contested over four days.

Symbols
The lady in the college logo, The Bowland Lady, represents the personification of Bowland Forest, and is from a Lancashire map drawn by William Hole for the 1622 edition of a poem "Poly-Olbion, or a Chorographical Description of ... The Renowned Isle of Great Britain", the lifetime's work of Michael Drayton, a friend of Shakespeare. The poem is in the University Library; a copy of the map is in the college bar.
The college magazine is also named after "The Bowland Lady". The Forest of Bowland was originally called "Bolland" and this pronunciation remains common amongst local people living in the forest.

The JCR motto is Bowland Til I Die.

College Buildings

The college has 641 study bedrooms overall, over two-fifths of which are en-suite. The standard residences in Bowland Main and Bowland North, along the North Spine, accommodate sociable kitchens shared between 16 and 26 people, and are situated around the college's main quadrangles. In contrast, Bowland Hall offers en-suite residences in a tranquil location by the tree-lined perimeter road; just four students share each flat.

Until 1995 the college occupied its main building, centred on its main quad, Bowland Tower and also Bowland Annexe which consisted of two wings overlooking Alexandra Square. In 1995 Slaidburn House was completed providing extra accommodation for the College to the south of Alexandra Square.

In 2004 the college named its main building Bowland Main and took over the space to its immediate north, which had been vacated by Lonsdale College. This was renamed Bowland North. In the same year the college gained the upper floors of Assistant Staff House and Graduate Hall, which was renamed Bowland Hall.

Bowland Annexe was renamed Bowland Tower East and Bowland Tower North; the college also acquired the Art Department building, which was subsequently renamed Bowland Annexe.

Bowland Annexe has 35 rooms on C floor, with two kitchens, one female bathroom and one male bathroom to share among the residents. 
There are three shower spaces and three toilets in the female bathroom.

Heater is present in all the rooms and in the bathrooms. There are approximately seven fire doors on the floor in the hallway and a fire drill takes place once a week. Residents with rooms overlooking Lancaster Square and Country Main can also enjoy the wind turbine view from their rooms.

The ground floor and first floor of Bowland Annexe belongs to the Arts Department, chemical smells should be expected upon entering the entrance. There is only one elevator that goes to the first floor, individuals should be prepared to move their luggage and belongings up the stairs. The third floor, also known as C floor, and the fourth floor, known as D floor are the main residency area. Each room has their own washing basins.

Parts of this estate were lent to other Colleges during building projects, but Bowland regained Slaidburn House in 2007, which is the accommodation above the campus Spar.

Bowland Tower will be officially opened during Lent Term, January 2014 to students who now reside in Ash House. 
Bowland Bar, known as the "Trough Of Bowland" and Bowland Main received makeovers in October 2011 and are now fully modernised, in keeping with most of the accommodation and bars on campus.

Gallery

Sport
Bowland College regularly competes in weekly inter-collegiate sports against the other eight colleges of Lancaster University. This comes in the form of their four men's football teams, four lady's netball teams and various bar sports including table tennis, pool and darts.

Bowland College won the inter-college trophy, the Carter Shield, in 2006, 2007, 2008 and more recently in 2016. It is also the overall winner of the Founders Trophy, an annual competition between Bowland and Lonsdale, the two founding colleges of Lancaster University. The competition usually takes place during the final term of the academic year, over a four day period. The two colleges compete in various sports including conventional college sports and also sports not usually competed by colleges such as, hockey, basketball, cricket, etc. Bowland has dominated the Founders Trophy since its conception; however, in recent years Lonsdale have found more success in the competition, closing the gap in terms of overall victories.

Bowland College has continued to be a main competitor in the Carter Shield and George Wyatt Trophy, in inter-collegiate sports.

Each year, Bowland College takes part in an Intercollegiate quiz along with the other nine colleges at Lancaster University, inspired by University Challenge. In 2018, Bowland College made it through to the final, along with Cartmel College and subsequently won, scoring 245-145.

Governance

Syndicate 
The University Statutes require the College Syndicate to be formally responsible for the strategic governance of the college. The Syndicate is chaired by the College Principal. Membership comprises all senior members of the college plus the current JCR Executive Officers. An additional 10 junior members may be appointed at the discretion of the Syndicate.

Meeting at least once a year, the Syndicate has overall responsibility for the strategic development and governance of the college, including the welfare of the student members and disciplinary matters. It may also discuss general matters relating to Colleges and the University as they arise, and report College views to University Senate, the governing academic body of the university.

College Management Committee 
In practice, most decisions relating to the day-to-day running of the college are discussed and determined at Management Committee meetings. The Management Committee reports to the Syndicate. 
Membership consists of several senior officers, plus the JCR President and Vice-President.

JCR Executive 
The Junior Common Room Executive, a standing committee of the Students' Union, consists of up to 15 students and is elected by the undergraduate population of the college in Michaelmas Term. The JCR Exec exists to represent students' views, organise socials and campaigns and provide opportunities for students to get involved in events and activities taking place in the college.

Bowland is unique as members of the Executive are officially titled "representatives" rather than "officers" (though the two are commonly used interchangeably).

Endowments
There is a Management Board which oversees the financial management and expenditure of funds received from benefactors: The Bowland College Trust Fund. The Board reports directly to Syndicate.

Notable alumni
 Damian Barr, Journalist and writer
 Antony Burgmans, Former Chairman of Unilever (until 2007)
 Brian Clegg, Author of popular science books
 Mark Price, Managing Director of Waitrose
 Jason Queally , Cyclist
 Bruce Sewell, Former Senior Vice President and General Counsel, Apple

References 

Colleges of Lancaster University
Bowland College, Lancaster